= Ezio Amadeo =

Italian politician

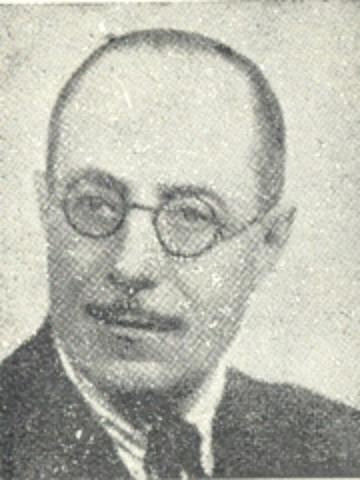
Ezio Amadeo

Ezio Amadeo (26 June 1894 - 23 May 1978) was an Italian politician.

Amadeo was born in Milan. He represented the Italian Republican Party in the Chamber of Deputies from 1948 to 1953 and in the Senate of the Republic from 1953 to 1958.
